Alta is a city in Buena Vista County, Iowa, United States. The population was 2,087 at the 2020 census.

History
Alta was platted in 1872, and it was incorporated in 1878. By 2004, Alta contained three general stores, two drug stores, two grocery stores, a shoe store, two hardware stores, a meat market, two lumber dealers, two agriculture implement dealers, bank two furniture stores, clothing store, barber shop, two saloons, music store, two jewelry stores, restaurant, four blacksmiths, two elevators, and a gristmill.

Halvor H. Peterson (1831–1917), Wisconsin State Assemblyman and farmer, lived in Alta.

Geography
Alta is located at  (42.672030, -95.304757). It is six miles from the city of Storm Lake and is approximately seven miles from Aurelia, and is located on Highway 7.

Demographics

2010 census
As of the census of 2010, there were 1,883 people, 759 households, and 509 families residing in the city. The racial makeup was 91.3% White, 1.6% African American, 0.2% Native American, 1.2% Asian, 4.7% from other races, and 1.1% from two or more races. Hispanic or Latino of any race were 15.7% of the population.

There were 759 households, of which 31.8% had children under the age of 18 living with them, 52.3% were married couples living together, 10.4% had a female householder with no husband present, 4.3% had a male householder with no wife present, and 32.9% were non-families. 28.5% of all households were made up of individuals, and 14.7% had someone living alone who was 65 years of age or older. The average household size was 2.48 and the average family size was 3.02.

The median age was 36.5 years. 27.1% of residents were under the age of 18; 8.5% were between the ages of 18 and 24; 23.2% were from 25 to 44; 24.3% were from 45 to 64; and 17% were 65 years of age or older. The gender makeup was 48.6% male and 51.4% female.

2000 census
As of the census of 2000, there were 1,865 people, 726 households, and 506 families. The racial makeup of the city was 92.44% White, 0.64% African American, 0.05% Native American, 1.39% Asian, 0.05% Pacific Islander, 4.45% from other races, and 0.97% from two or more races. Hispanic or Latino of any race were 10.62% of the population.

There were 726 households, out of which 35.3% had children under the age of 18 living with them, 55.4% were married couples living together, 9.9% had a female householder with no husband present, and 30.3% were non-families. 25.8% of all households were made up of individuals, and 14.2% had someone living alone who was 65 years of age or older. The average household size was 2.56 and the average family size was 3.07.

29.7% are under the age of 18, 7.7% from 18 to 24, 28.3% from 25 to 44, 18.5% from 45 to 64, and 15.9% were 65 years of age or older. The median age was 35 years. For every 100 females, there were 96.9 males. For every 100 females age 18 and over, there were 91.1 males.

The median income for a household in the city was $31,941, and the median income for a family was $40,694. Males had a median income of $29,655 versus $20,368 for females. The per capita income for the city was $15,908. About 8.5% of families and 11.3% of the population were below the poverty line, including 12.9% of those under age 18 and 5.0% of those age 65 or over.

Education
Alta is within the Alta–Aurelia Community School District. It was in the Alta Community School District, which previously operated Alta High School.

The two districts merged into Alta–Aurelia on July 1, 2018.

See also

 List of cities in Iowa

References

External links

 ALTA Portal style website, Government, Businesses, community events, and more

Cities in Buena Vista County, Iowa
Cities in Iowa
1872 establishments in Iowa
Populated places established in 1872